Marvel 1602 is an eight-issue comic book limited series published in 2003 by Marvel Comics. The limited series was written by Neil Gaiman, penciled by Andy Kubert, and digitally painted by Richard Isanove; Scott McKowen illustrated the distinctive scratchboard covers.

The eight-part series takes place in a timeline where Marvel superheroes are members of Elizabethan society. The characters are mainly from Marvel's 1960s period and include Nick Fury, the X-Men, the Fantastic Four, Doctor Doom and Magneto. Spider-Man also features, though he appears much younger than the 1960s version and does not have any superpowers.

Other popular characters, such as Wolverine and Storm, were not added, because of Gaiman's vision to address the heroes of the 1960s. "The territory doesn't go much further than 1969 in terms of the characters that I picked to use," Gaiman noted. "I couldn't get everybody in because there are an awful lot of Marvel characters."

Historical figures
 Elizabeth I of England - Her history is essentially unchanged from the real-world version. She is assassinated by Count Otto von Doom (see below), a year before she should have died of natural causes.
 James VI of Scotland and I of England - His history is also largely unchanged. He keeps his firm belief in the Divine Right of Kings and his loathing of the witchbreed (this reality's version of mutants) mirrors the real-life James' view of Catholics. James later took the throne of Elizabeth I following her death and conspired with the Grand Inquisitor to eliminate the Witchbreed. When Javier criticizes Fury for smoking a pipe, Fury remarks that James once made similar reproaches. James was indeed critical of smoking and even wrote A Counterblaste to Tobacco on the subject. On the other hand, he was also a heavy drinker, and he is seldom shown without a cup of wine in his hand. There are also hints towards his homosexuality in this timeline, as there was some suggestion that he was in real life. He was later killed by the Hulk as revealed in Hulk: Broken Worlds #2. He was also later revealed to be this world's version of Wolverine in a later storyline.
 Virginia Dare - The first English child born in the Americas. In this world, the Roanoke Colony did not disappear in the 1580s. Inspired by a legend that Virginia was killed in the shape of a white deer, Gaiman gives his version shapeshifting powers. She is able to become any real animal (e.g., a wolf and a white deer), dinosaurs that in this timeline still survive in America (e.g., a Tyrannosaurus), and mythological creatures (like a griffin and a sphinx). She was later killed by Master Norman Osborne. Gaiman has stated that he created Virginia Dare without a previous Marvel character basis in order to provide a unique and fully American character in the 1602 universe.. However, her aspect and powers resemble the ones of the Canadian superhero Snowbird.
 William Shakespeare - A playwright who served the court of Elizabeth I and James I. While working on the scripts for Macbeth, he is kidnapped by the Vulture-Fliers and forced by Otto Von Doom to chronicle his journeys to the advanced city of Bensaylum (this reality's Atlantis) in Marvel 1602: Fantastick Four.

Heroes
 Sir Nicholas Fury - The Queen's Intelligencer. The 1602 world's version of Nick Fury is in the position of Sir Francis Walsingham, one of the great spymasters of the time who obtained the evidence that led to the execution of Mary, Queen of Scots, and vital information that helped defeat the Spanish Armada. When she introduces him to Strange, Queen Elizabeth tells Fury not to give his official title since he will "tell us we do not pay you enough". In fact Elizabeth was extremely cautious with money and Walsingham's secret service got very poor financial support from the state. Dedicated to protecting the realm from threats both inside and out, Walsingham himself got into debt employing agents who have been described as "spies on a shoestring" budget.
 Doctor Stephen Strange - The Queen's physician who is also an alchemist and magician. Strange's interests and skills mirror some of those of the Queen's contemporary John Dee, a mathematician, astrologer, and geographer who was also interested in conjuring. Strange works from his mansion in the then-village of Greenwich outside London (a play on the "real" Doctor Strange's mansion in Greenwich Village, New York City).
 Peter Parquagh - Sir Nicholas' apprentice. He is this world's Spider-Man (Peter Parker), although without the powers, but with a keen interest in spiders. A running plot thread is that Peter is constantly being prevented from being bitten by spiders, which is how his mainstream counterpart obtained his powers. When Rojhaz climbs up a tower to fetch Virginia, Peter timidly and ironically says "I can't climb." He is however bitten by a spider caught in the closing timestream rift and later develops powers similar to those of the mainstream Spider-Man, adopting the alias of "the Spider". There are hints of a budding romance between Peter and Virginia Dare, who resembles the ill-fated Gwen Stacy. This is further implied by Virginia's murder at the hands of Norman Osborne. In a lead-up to the Spider-Verse storyline, Peter Parquagh was killed by Morlun.
 Matthew Murdoch - A blind Irish minstrel and freelance agent who occasionally works for Sir Nicholas. Matthew acquired heightened senses from a mysterious substance he encountered as a child, and is this world's Daredevil (a.k.a. Matt Murdock). He shows a lot of the quick wit and humour that Daredevil displayed before Frank Miller turned him into a more serious and moody character.
 Clea Strange - Dr. Strange's wife and assistant. Clea comes from another dimension (in which she used to be a Queen) and is herself a sorceress. She is this world's version of Clea.
 Rojhaz (pronounced "Ro-gers") - Virginia's blonde-haired, blue-eyed Native American bodyguard. The colonists assume him to be a product of congress between Indians and Welsh traders (see Welsh Indians). In fact he is actually Steve Rogers a.k.a. Captain America. Imprisoned in a dystopian future ruled by a President-for-Life and sent back in time, Rogers, and the hole his passage has left in time, serves as the trigger for the warping of history that introduces the other Marvels. He also changes history more directly by helping the Roanoke Colony through the winter.
 Carlos Javier - A Spaniard living in England where he runs a College for the Sons of Gentlefolk. He is a witchbreed, a being born with special powers (i.e. mutants). But unlike the Inquisitor (see below), he believes in a future of peace between witchbreed (which he calls mutantur or changing ones) and normal humans (the mondani). He is this world's Professor X.
 Carlos Javier's students - This world's version of the original X-Men. They are:
 Roberto Trefusis (Robert "Bobby" Drake, Iceman) - A nephew of Sir Francis Drake.
 Scotius Summerisle (Scott Summers, Cyclops) - He wears a visor made of rubies, and has a branded X on his shoulder which was put there when he was found to be a witchbreed in Scotland.
 Hal McCoy (Hank McCoy, the Beast)  - A student with a grotesque appearance. He also escaped from James' Scotland.
 "John" Grey (Jean Grey) - "John" Grey is in fact a young woman (a reference to Shakespeare's plays in which young men often dress up women: As You Like It and Twelfth Night).
 Werner (Warren Worthington III, the Angel) - He was rescued from the Inquisition. His friendship with "Master John" causes jealous resentment on the part of Scotius Summerisle, though Werner is unaware of "John's" true sex. In fact he implies some homosexual feelings towards "Master John", which contrasts with the 1960s version of the Angel who was portrayed as a womanizing playboy. However, it also pays tribute to the love triangle between Jean, Scott, and Warren in the '60s.
 Uatu the Watcher - He knows that all these heroes and villains are not due for another 350 years and is tempted to break the rules of the Watchers and interfere (albeit not for the first time). The other Watchers see his actions as being for the greater good since the destruction of this universe could result in that of others, leaving them with nothing to watch. Thus they interfere as minimally as possible and Uatu is ultimately rewarded with a gift: the seed of this universe preserved rather than altered by Captain America's return to the future.
 The Four from the Fantastick - A famous group of heroes who feature in Murdoch's favourite ballad (which Gaiman has written a full version of, although only snippets appear in the comic). They were all transformed when their sailing ship, the Fantastick, encountered a wave of energy from the Sargasso Sea. Trapped under the castle of Count Otto von Doom, they remain in imprisonment until rescued by Sir Nicholas Fury and Carlos Javier. They are this world's Fantastic Four. Gaiman makes the interesting observation that their bodies reflect the four elements that alchemists believed made up all things. They consist of:
 Captain Benjamin Grimm - The captain of the Fantastick. Grimm's body becomes solid rock
 Sir Richard Reed - The explorer and genius who convinced the others to go on the voyage. Reed's flesh becomes pliable like water.
 Susan Storm - Reed's fiancé. Unlike her 616 counterpart, she is permanently invisible. Susan's body becomes weightless and invisible like air
 Master Jonathan Storm - He retains his hot-headed and sarcastic personality, as well as his rivalry with Ben Grimm, but appears to be several years older than in the 616 continuity; in the original comics, Johnny was a teenager and the same age as Peter Parker, while in 1602 he seems to be an adult. John's body becomes living fire.
 Donal the Ancient One - A Knight Templar who is entrusted with taking the "Templar Treasure" to Sir Stephen Strange. This proves to be the hammer Mjolnir, disguised as a simple walking stick. Donal is forced to use the hammer to become Thor, a pagan god who according to Donal's religion should not even exist. This act of blasphemy turns him to drink. He is this world's version of Donald Blake, a.k.a. the Mighty Thor. In a clever conceit, while the Marvel Universe Thor has Shakespearean speech patterns, the 1602 version speaks in Anglo-Saxon alliterative verse, and the calligraphy-style lettering in his speech bubbles is replaced with a rune-like font.
 Henri Le Pym - Henri Le Pym is a philosopher who Victor Octavius blackmailed into helping to find a cure for him at the time he was trying to cure his shrunken wife. When his wife was covered in a spilled elixir he was working on, he licked it off her resulting in him becoming a giant. He is this reality's version of Henry Pym.
 Janette Le Pym - Janette is Henri's wife who was shrunken by accident. After being hit by a spilled elixir, she became a human/wasp hybrid. She is this reality's version of Wasp.

Supporting Characters
 Captain Nelson - A seaman who regularly takes Matthew Murdoch across the English Channel. He is suspicious of the blind minstrel who suggests with a smile that he should keep his thoughts to himself. Nelson is this world's Foggy Nelson.
 Dougan - The second-in-command of Fury's armies. He is very loyal to Fury and goes with him to Count Otto Von Doom's castle and the New World, where he stays and becomes the head of the police force, becoming a friend to Dare, as seen in 1602: New World. He is this world's Dum Dum Dugan.
 Jonah Jameson - An Irish-accented newspaper owner in the New World. He is almost exactly like his Marvel Universe counterpart including his dislike of people with "powers". His newspaper is called the Daily Trumpet which is this reality's version of the Daily Bugle.
 Rhodes - Rhodes is Lord Iron's Moorish engineer. His Marvel Universe counterpart is James Rhodes (a.k.a. War Machine).
 Captain Ross - He is the English captain of the vessel that transports Lord Iron to the New World. He is the 1602 manifestation of Marvel's General Ross, since both men were charged with subduing the Hulk and his human counterpart.
 Richard and Mary Parquagh - The parents of "The Spider". They were mentioned to have worked for Sir Nicholas Fury. They are this reality's versions of Richard and Mary Parker.
 Numenor - He is the ruler of Bensaylum (this reality's Atlantis). He is this reality's version of Namor.
 Rita - She is the cousin of Numenor. She is this reality's version of Namorita.
 Lord Wyatt Wingfoot - A lord who is a rival to the Human Torch for the affection of Doris Evans.
 Steve Rogers - About more than 300 years in the present Earth-311, an ill Steven Rogers was injected with a version of the super-soldier serum based on one of Henri Le Pym's preserved vial containing the Spider's blood. This allowed him to become this universe's modern Captain America.
 Marioac  - She is the leader of the local Native Americans who are feuding with the colonists. Marioa becomes a sort of friend to both Peter and Banner, and is portrayed as a little magical or supernatural. She is not based on a character in the traditional Marvel Universe.
 Governor Dare - He is the governor of the colony and a wise and heroic man, although not based on a Marvel character.

Villains
Please note: among the characters classed as villains (i.e., enemies of the main protagonists) are characters who in the mainstream Marvel universe are actual heroes (e.g., Hulk), or villains-turned-heroes (e.g., Scarlet Witch, Quicksilver, and the Black Widow).

 "Brotherhood Of Those Who Will Inherit The Earth" - A secret society formed by Enrique, the Spanish Inquisitor who is actually one of the so-called Witchbreeds that the Inquisition has sworn to destroy. The society's name is a biblical allusion: "those that wait upon the Lord, they shall inherit the earth." (King James Bible Psalm 37:9). Among its members are:
 Grand Inquisitor Enrique - Born a Jew, he was taken in by a Christian priest and baptized (and also implied to have been molested). The Christians later refused to let him be returned to his Jewish family, saying that giving him back to the 'Christ-killers' would damn his soul to Hell. As an adult, he leads the Spanish Inquisition which he oversees from Domdaniel. Although ordered to execute the witchbreed, he hides those whom he can pass off as normal with him being secretly a witchbreed himself. He is this world's Magneto.
 Sister Wanda and Petros - The Inquisitor's assistants. They are also his children, a fact he has kept from them. They are this world's Scarlet Witch and Quicksilver (Wanda and Pietro Maximoff).
 Toad - He is Enrique's spy in the Vatican. Though his long tongue and ability for climbing walls are plainly visible, he manages to hide for an undisclosed, but lengthy amount of time. Gaiman also plays with other cold-blooded characteristics, such as a pronounced sleepiness at low temperatures.
 David Banner - An advisor to King James, who replaces Sir Nicholas Fury when James takes the English throne. He is then sent to Roanoke with orders to kill Fury. Towards the end of the story, he is caught in the energies of the Anomaly and becomes a brutish monster. He is this world's Hulk.
 Natasha - A freelance spy and "the most dangerous woman in Europe". She is partnered with Murdoch by Sir Nicholas, but betrays him and Donal to Count Otto. She is this world's Black Widow (who is one of Daredevil's regular on-off girlfriends).
 Count Otto von Doom - The ruler of Latveria, known as Otto the Handsome and he is indeed a good-looking man. A long-time enemy of Sir Richard Reed, he is responsible for the Four from the Fantastick's disappearance by the story's start. He is this world's version of Doctor Doom, though his face-scarring injuries come after rather than before the Four from the Fantastick acquire their powers.
 Master Norman Osborne - He wants to trick the Native Americans into selling the island of Roanoke. However, they have been educated in the English language by 'Rojhaz' (Captain America from the future) and see the flaw in his contract. Norman seeks to turn the colony against the natives, because he believes that the natives are hiding something of great value. He is this world's Green Goblin.
 Lord Iron - A Spaniard weaponeer who was famous for his inventions. Lord Iron was captured during the war against England and was tortured by David Banner for weeks in order to manufacture new and deadly weapons. He has since built a suit of armor powered by electricity and harbors a grudge against Banner. Despite his allegiance, he has no special loyalty towards King James, and merely seeks revenge on Banner and by association the Hulk. He is this world's Iron Man.
 The Vulture-Fliers - They are Count Otto von Doom's flying warriors, based on the Spider-Man villain the Vulture.
 The Assassins are sent by Count Otto von Doom to murder Sir Nicholas Fury, Virginia Dare, and Queen Elizabeth:
 The first assassin does not appear to have a definitive counterpart in the regular Marvel Universe.
 The second is a Vulture-Flier.
 The third is a booby-trapped musical machine.
 Baron Victor Octavius - An Italian nobleman and brilliant scientist living in exile in France who suffered from the bubonic plague. Octavius attempted to cure himself by using the blood of octopi which worked, but also slowly transformed him into a human/octopus hybrid. He is this reality's version of Doctor Octopus.
 Curtis Connors - A philosopher who was infected with the bubonic plague. He created an elixir that transformed him into a reptilian creature that resembled a velociraptor, but retained his mind. He worked with Baron Victor Octavius to capture the Spider. He is this world's Lizard.
 Four Who Are Frightful - Four Jacobean hired by Otto Von Doom to find the Lost City of Bensaylum. They are this reality's version of the Frightful Four. Among its members are:
 Wizard - A magic-user who is the leader of the Four Who Are Frightful. He is this reality's version of Wizard.
 Medusa - Medusa is the lover of the Wizard. She has snakes for hair and needs to wear a veil to prevent her gaze from turning men to stone. Though she has snakes for hair, she is still depicted as this reality's version of Medusa.
 Marko - An Albino who can conjure up dreams and nightmares. He can also induce sleep and waking dreams by blowing sand on people. Despite the difference, he is this reality's version of Sandman. He appears to be partially based on Gaiman's other character known as the Sandman (who appeared in DC comics).
 Trapster - A skilled huntsman. He is this reality's version of Trapster.
 The King's Pin - Wilson Fiske is a pirate captain of the H.M.S. Vanessa and was known to have never spare any survivors he attacks. He is this reality's version of Kingpin.
 Bull's Eye - He is an assassin and the second mate to Wilson Fiske.
 The future President-For-Life - He assumes power in a 20th or 21st century America and rounds up and jails many aging heroes. He is also responsible for shunting Captain America, a living symbol of freedom, into the past. His dark-purple face on a poster (in contrast to the lighter pink of the other characters seen in flashback) implies that he is the Purple Man at the summit of his powers of persuasion.

References

External links
 1602: Fantastick Four on Marvel.com
 1602 Timeline entry on Uncannyxmen.net

Marvel 1602 characters